The 1975–76 Tercera División season is the 42nd since its establishment.

League tables

Group I

Group II

Group III

Group IV

Promotion playoff

Relegation playoff

Tiebreakers

Season records
 Most wins: 24, Pontevedra and Real Jaén.
 Most draws: 15, Linares and Algeciras.
 Most losses: 29, Calella.
 Most goals for: 72, Bilbao Athletic and Castilla.
 Most goals against: 94, Calella.
 Most points: 55, Pontevedra and Real Jaén.
 Fewest wins: 3, Michelín.
 Fewest draws: 4, Deportivo Gijón and Manresa.
 Fewest losses: 6, Barakaldo.
 Fewest goals for: 21, Calella.
 Fewest goals against: 18, Real Jaén.
 Fewest points: 13, Calella.

Notes

External links
RSSSF 
Futbolme 

Tercera División seasons
3
Spain